The first series of Special Agent Oso aired between  and  on Playhouse Disney.

Episodes
Notes: The bolded text indicates that the characters are absent from both a and b. Special Agent Oso, Paw Pilot, and Mr. Dos were present in all episodes. The number with the parenthesis on step 3 indicates the number of seconds to complete the step.

{| class="wikitable sortable plainrowheaders" style="width: 100%;"
|-
! width="8%" | Episode number
! width="8%" | Series episode number
! width="44%" | Title
! width="12%" | UKAir Date
! width="12%" | USAAir Date
! width="12%" | ProductionCode
|-

|}

References

2009 British television seasons
2010 British television seasons